United Nations Security Council resolution 753, adopted without a vote on 18 May 1992, after examining the application of the Republic of Croatia for membership in the United Nations, the Council recommended to the General Assembly that Croatia be admitted. The recommendation came amid the breakup of Yugoslavia.

See also
 Member states of the United Nations
 List of United Nations Security Council Resolutions 701 to 800 (1991–1993)

References

External links
 
Text of the Resolution at undocs.org

 0753
 0753
 0753
May 1992 events
1992 in Croatia